The 1981 Pot Black was a professional invitational snooker tournament, which was held between 28 and 31 December 1980 in the Pebble Mill Studios in Birmingham. 8 players were competing in 2 four player groups. The matches are one-frame shoot-outs in the group stages, 2 frame aggregate scores in the semi-finals and the best of 3 frames in the final.

Broadcasts were on BBC2 and started at 21:00 on Tuesday 30 December 1980  Alan Weeks presented the programme with Ted Lowe as commentator and top referee John Williams replaced Sydney Lee after 13 years after Lee retired to ill health.

First time players this year are Canadians Kirk Stevens and Jim Wych. The latter made the final against fellow Canadian Cliff Thorburn before losing 0–2.

Main draw

Group 1

Group 2

Knockout stage

References

Pot Black
1981 in snooker
1981 in English sport